Menno Aden (born 18 November 1942 in Berchtesgaden) is a German academic, politician and translator.

Aden studied law at the University of Bonn and taught at FOM University of Applied Sciences for Economics and Management.

After having been a member of the Christian Democratic Union for 30 years, Aden resigned in protest over Angela Merkel's policies, and was elected to the Essen City Council in 2014, representing the Alternative for Germany party. He then left that party and served on the council as an independent until 2020. Aden has written numerous articles for a wide variety of publications including the Junge Freiheit newspaper. He has been criticized for Holocaust revisionism.

Aden served as President of the Evangelical Lutheran Church of Mecklenburg from 1994 to 1996. He has translated Richard Francis Burton's The Kasidah into German, as well as many poems by Alexander Pushkin, Michail Lermontow, Fjodor Tjutschew and other Russin poets.
Aden is author of numerous legal works, i.a. the pioneering "Internationale Handelschiedsgerichtsbarkeit - Kommentar zu den Verfahrensordnungen" 1988; 2002(International Commercial Arbitration, Commentary to  Arbitration Rules) .

References

Living people
1942 births
German Lutherans
Politicians from Essen
Alternative for Germany politicians
Independent politicians in Germany
People from Berchtesgaden
English–German translators
Translators of Alexander Pushkin
University of Bonn alumni